Fariba Nawa (born 1973) is an Afghan-American freelance journalist who grew up in both Herat and Lashkargah in Afghanistan as well as Fremont, California. She was born in Herat, Afghanistan to a native Afghan family. Her family fled the country during the Soviet invasion in the 1980s. She is trilingual in Persian, Arabic, and English. She has done her master's degree in Middle Eastern Studies and Journalism from New York University.  In 2000 she ventured into Taliban controlled Afghanistan by sneaking into the country through Iran. She lived and reported from Afghanistan from 2000 to 2007. Furthermore, She travelled extensively in Afghanistan, Iran, Pakistan, Egypt, and Germany, reporting on her experiences.

Her report "Afghanistan Inc." (in Corp Watch) is one of the main resources used in different media around the globe while debating effectiveness of reconstruction efforts in Afghanistan. She examines the progress of reconstruction, uncovers some examples of where the money has, and has not, gone, how the system of international aid works, and does not, and what it is really like in the villages and cities where outsiders are rebuilding the war-torn countryside. She's been a freelance writer for 15 years, covering war, corruption, human/rights, women's cultural trends, and parenting for a range of prestigious newspapers and radio stations.

Her book Opium Nation was published in November 2011. The book is her personal account of the drug trade in Afghanistan and how it has affected the poor and disadvantaged. 

Her writing has appeared in a variety of media, including The Atlantic, Newsweek, Sunday Times of London, Foreign Affairs, Daily Beast, Newsday, Mother Jones, The Village Voice, The Christian Science Monitor, San Francisco Chronicle, and others. She also contributes to radio stations such as National Public Radio (NPR).

Awards 

 PEN USA finalist in research nonfiction for Opium Nation Sep. 2012 

 Achievement in community service from Afghan Coalition Mar. 2013

 Project Censored for investigative report Afghanistan, Inc. Oct. 2007

 One World Broadcasting Trust Press Award for “Brides of the drug lords” Jun. 2005 

 Overseas Press Club Scholarship for an essay on the drug trade in Afghanistan Jan. 2004

References

External links

Official Website
CorpWatch : Afghanistan, Inc.: A CorpWatch Investigative Report 
Profile - Afghan Magazine 
Famous article - Home After 20 Years, Travel To Herat 
Article: Half Way Home 
Article: ''Khoshnawaz Brothers Keep Herat's Music Alive 

Living people
1973 births
Afghan women journalists
Afghan writers
Afghan journalists
American people of Afghan descent
Women in 21st-century warfare
American writers of Afghan descent
Women war correspondents
21st-century Afghan women writers
21st-century Afghan writers

Hampshire College alumni